Metinvest International SA (until December 2007 known as Leman Commodities SA) is a Swiss-based steel trading company established in 1997. It is located in Geneva (Switzerland), and is the distribution channel of Steel and Rolled Products Division and Iron Ore Division of Metinvest Group.

Company profile 

Metinvest International sells and distributes the following product ranges: Iron ore products, Pig iron, Semi-finished Products, Flat products, Long products, SAW Pipes, rails and rail fasteners.

Offices 
Metinvest International has offices in 10 countries: Switzerland (Headquarter), Turkey, Italy, Lebanon, China, Lithuania, Tunisia, UAE and Singapore. Metinvest International also has established agencies in Canada and Dominican Republic which handle sales in the North and Latin Americas. correspondingly.

Plants 
 Azovstal Iron and Steel Works
 Yenakievo Iron and Steel Works
 Khartsyzsk pipe plant
 Ferriera Valsider
 Trametal
 PROMET STEEL Bulgaria https://promet.metinvestholding.com/en/activities/products
 Spartan UK

Mills 
SEVGOK
INGOK
CGOK

References

External links 
 Metinvest International SA official website
 System Capital Management - official website

Metinvest